Izaak Ziven Sayid Golding Bastian (born 3 January 2001) is a Bahamian swimmer. He competed in the 2020 Summer Olympics.

He competed at the collegiate level for Florida State University.

At the 2022 Commonwealth Games, held in July and August in Birmingham, England, Bastian served as a flag bearer for the Bahamas at the Opening Ceremony. Two days later, as part of swimming at the 2022 Commonwealth Games, he placed 23rd in the 100 metre breaststroke with a time of 1:04.07. On 1 August, he swam a time of 28.74 seconds in the preliminaries of the 50 metre breaststroke and placed 20th overall. 

Upon graduating from Florida State University in 2022, Izaak was enrolled in the Doctorate of Physical Therapy program at Florida Gulf Coast University. He is on track to graduate with his doctorate in 2025 and has a professional interest in completing an Orthopedic residency the year following.

References

External links
 Florida State Seminoles bio

2001 births
Living people
Sportspeople from Nassau, Bahamas
Swimmers at the 2020 Summer Olympics
Bahamian male swimmers
Olympic swimmers of the Bahamas
Swimmers at the 2018 Summer Youth Olympics
Florida State Seminoles men's swimmers
Swimmers at the 2022 Commonwealth Games
Commonwealth Games competitors for the Bahamas